

Roarke may refer to:

People
Roarke Smith: a professional Australian rules footballer
Adam Roarke: American actor and film director
Mike Roarke: retired American catcher and coach in Major League Baseball
John Roarke: American actor
George Roarke: American songwriter

Fictional characters

Literature
Roarke (In Death): a fictional character from J. D. Robb's series in Death
Patrick Roarke: a fictional character from J. D. Robb's series in Death

Television
Mr. Roarke: a fictional character from the American television series Fantasy Island
Henry Roarke: a fictional character from the American television series Quantico
Brendan Roarke: a fictional character from the American television series Sons of Anarchy

Film
Roarke Hartman: a fictional character from the American film The River Wild
Roarke: a fictional character from the American film Ghost Rider: Spirit of Vengeance
Josephine 'Jo' Douglas O'Roarke: a fictional character from the American film Jealousy
Larry O'Roarke: a fictional character from the American film Jealousy